The Thani bin Jassim Stadium, also known as the Al-Gharrafa Stadium, is a multi-purpose stadium in the Al Gharrafa district of Doha, Qatar.  It is currently used mostly for football matches.  Al-Gharrafa SC and Umm Salal SC play there. The stadium holds 21,175 people and was built in 2003. The stadium hosted matches of the 2011 AFC Asian Cup and other international competitions.

In November 2021, the Asian Football Confederation confirmed that Iraq's 2022 FIFA World Cup qualification matches against Syria and South Korea will be played there.

Proposed expansion 
As part of the Qatar 2022 FIFA World Cup bid, the stadium was planned to be expanded to 44,740, and be rebuilt with a facade made up the colours of flags of the world. The modular design of the second tier was to allow for easy disassembly after the World Cup. The expansion did not take place, and other venues were used to host the games at Qatar 2022.

References

External links 
Stadium Information

Football venues in Qatar
Sports venues completed in 2003
Sport in Al Rayyan
Multi-purpose stadiums in Qatar
Al-Gharafa SC